{{He started his football Career with Chambishi Fc and left them in the 1996-97 football season when they lost their key Midfield player Gift Kampamba who moved to " kalampa" Nkana FC.

 During his time at Nkana he was a very skillful attacker who made football so entertaining with his deadly passes to the twin Strikers Frazer Kamwandi and Musole Sakulanda. 

He was called to both, the Under 20 and U- 23 junior chipolopolo teams and later featured for the Senior National Team.

In the 2000 When Nkana faced Mammelodi Sundowns in Kitwe in a Caf Champions League match he put up an outstanding performance that earned him a move to the South African Giants the following year. 

After several man of the match appearances at Sundowns in the PSL, the footballing russians came calling as the talented Zambian signed for Rostov in Europe.}}

Gift Kampamba (born January 1, 1979) is a former Zambian professional footballer.

Honours
 Russian Cup finalist: 2003.

References

External links
 Profile at footballdatabase.eu

Zambian footballers
Zambia international footballers
Zambian expatriate footballers
Russian Premier League players
Zambian expatriate sportspeople in South Africa
Mamelodi Sundowns F.C. players
FC Rostov players
1979 births
Living people
People from Kitwe
2002 African Cup of Nations players
Green Buffaloes F.C. players
Nkana F.C. players
Sabah F.C. (Malaysia) players
Expatriate soccer players in South Africa
Expatriate footballers in Russia
Expatriate footballers in Sweden
Association football midfielders